Buckingham Correctional Center is a state prison (close custody male institution) located on 968 acres (3.9 km2) outside the town of Dillwyn in Buckingham County, Virginia, USA.  This facility is a Security Level 3-4 and has assignment criteria of Single, Multiple, and Life. Transfer to any less-secure facility requires no disruptive behavior for at least 24 months prior to consideration.

Specifications
Opened - 1982
Average Daily Population (as of 2008) - 1038
Special Populations - None
Special Programs - Project SOAR and Pen Pals Program
Site Additions/Upgrades - 1988 - N Building Added
Virginia Correctional Enterprises - Metal Industry
John Woodson, Warden

References

External links
Virginia Department of Corrections listing

Prisons in Virginia
Buildings and structures in Buckingham County, Virginia
1982 establishments in Virginia